Satlu or Satloo may refer to:
 Satlu, East Azerbaijan (ساتلو - Saţlū)
 Satlu, Hormozgan (ساتلو - Saţlū)
 Satlu, West Azerbaijan (ساعتلو - Sāʿtlū)
 Satlu (ساعتلو - Sāʿtlū), alternate name of Saatluy Kuh, West Azerbaijan Province